Muhammad Iqbal Butt (born 11 December 1929) was a Pakistani weightlifter. He competed at the 1948 Summer Olympics, the 1952 Summer Olympics and the 1956 Summer Olympics.

References

External links
 

1929 births
Possibly living people
Pakistani male weightlifters
Olympic weightlifters of Pakistan
Weightlifters at the 1948 Summer Olympics
Weightlifters at the 1952 Summer Olympics
Weightlifters at the 1956 Summer Olympics
Place of birth missing
Asian Games medalists in weightlifting
Weightlifters at the 1954 Asian Games
Weightlifters at the 1958 Asian Games
Asian Games silver medalists for Pakistan
Medalists at the 1954 Asian Games
20th-century Pakistani people